The Platinum Collection or Platinum Collection may refer to:

Albums
The Platinum Collection (Alicia Keys album)
The Platinum Collection (Blancmange album)
The Platinum Collection (Blondie album)
The Platinum Collection (Blue album)
The Platinum Collection (Chaka Khan album)
The Platinum Collection (Cliff Richard album)
The Platinum Collection (D:Ream album)
The Platinum Collection (Dannii Minogue album)
The Platinum Collection (David Bowie album)
The Platinum Collection (Deep Purple album)
The Platinum Collection (Dollar album)
The Platinum Collection (The Doors album)
The Platinum Collection (En Vogue album)
The Platinum Collection (Enigma album)
The Platinum Collection (Everything but the Girl album)
The Platinum Collection (Faith No More album)
The Platinum Collection (Frank Sinatra album)
The Platinum Collection (Gary Moore album)
The Platinum Collection (Glen Campbell album)
The Platinum Collection (Guy Clark album)
The Platinum Collection (Happy Mondays album)
The Platinum Collection (Il Volo album)
The Platinum Collection (Héroes Del Silencio album)
The Platinum Collection Volume 1: Shout to the Lord (Hillsong)
The Platinum Collection Volume 2: Shout to the Lord 2 (Hillsong)
The Platinum Collection Volume 2: Shout to the Lord 3 (Hillsong)
The Platinum Collection (John Williamson album)
The Platinum Collection (Laura Branigan album)
The Platinum Collection (Mike Oldfield album)
The Platinum Collection (Mina album)
The Platinum Collection (Nomadi album)
The Platinum Collection (Peter Andre)
The Platinum Collection (Phil Collins album)
The Platinum Collection (Queen album)
The Platinum Collection (Sandra album)
The Platinum Collection (Scorpions album)
The Platinum Collection (Take That album)
The Platinum Collection (The Darkness album)
The Platinum Collection (Tina Turner album)
Platinum Collection (Genesis album)
Platinum Collection (Rossa album), 2013
Platinum Collection (Željko Joksimović album)
Platinum Collection (Steps album), 2022
The Best of Platinum Collection by Mina, 2007

DVDs
The Platinum Collection (DVD), by Shania Twain

Games
Xbox 360 Platinum Hits are known as "Platinum Collection games" in Japan.

See also

The Platinum Collection (Sounds of Summer Edition), a three-disc greatest hits album by American rock band the Beach Boys